Colmberg is a municipality in the district of Ansbach in Bavaria in Germany. Colmberg is the site of Colmberg Castle, built in the 13th century and purchased in 1318 by Duke Frederick IV of Nuremberg. The town is located in Nature Park Frankenhöhe.

Notable residents
Karl Amson Joel, a textile merchant and grandfather of American musician Billy Joel

Twin towns
 Wartenburg, Saxony-Anhalt

Gallery

See also

Franconia
List of castles in Bavaria
Romantic Road

References

External links
Official website 
Colmberg Castle

Ansbach (district)